Ceratocystis adiposa is a species of fungus in the family Ceratocystidaceae. It is a plant pathogen.

References

Fungal plant pathogens and diseases
Fungi described in 1952
Microascales